Salim Wardeh (Arabic: سليم وردة) (born October 1, 1968, in Zahle, Lebanon) was the Minister of Culture in Lebanon until June 2011, when he was replaced by Gaby Layoun. Wardeh is a Catholic Christian and is a member of the Lebanese Forces which in turn is a member of the March 14 Alliance. Wardeh is a member of the board of directors of Tell Shiha Hospital. He also holds Australian citizenship.

Business career 
He is the General Manager of Solifed, a family business specializing in making wine that was founded in 1971 but dates back to 1893.

Personal life 
He is married to Nidal Hakim  and has two children Macy(1996) and Aziz(1998)

Miscellaneous 
He underwent a failed kidnapping attempt in 1977. The kidnappers wanted to ask for ransom from Wardeh's wealthy business family.

See also 
 Lebanese government of November 2009
 Lebanese Forces
 March 14 Alliance
 Lebanese Christians
 Lebanese Australians
 List of Lebanese people
 Lebanese wine

References

Notes 
Alternative transliterations used in the media: Warde, Wardy.

External links 
 Official website of Solifed
 Solifed's profile on 1st Lebanon

Living people
1968 births
People from Zahle
Government ministers of Lebanon
Lebanese Forces politicians
21st-century Lebanese businesspeople
Lebanese winemakers
Lebanese Christians
Lebanese Melkite Greek Catholics
Australian people of Lebanese descent